The 2015 Sunshine Ladies Tour was the 2nd season of the Sunshine Ladies Tour, a series of professional golf tournaments for women based in  South Africa.

Schedule 
The season consisted of 9 events, all held in South Africa, played between October and March.

Order of Merit 
This shows the leaders in the final Order of Merit, the Chase to the Investec Ladies Cup. The winner was awarded R250,000 from a R600,000 bonus pool.

Source:

References

External links 
Official homepage of the Sunshine Ladies Tour

Sunshine Ladies Tour
Sunshine Ladies Tour